To Hell is the sixth studio album of the German power metal band Dawn of Destiny.

Track listing

Personnel

Dawn Of Destiny 
Jens Faber – guitars, bass, piano, vocals, producer, engineering, lyrics, songwriting
Dirk Raczkiewicz – keyboards
Jeanette Scherff – vocals
Philipp Bock – drums, percussion

Guest musicians 
Björn "Speed" Strid – vocals (track 7)
Zak Stevens – vocals (track 8)
Marco Wriedt – lead guitars (track 11)
Veith Offenbächer – lead guitars (tracks 1, 2 and 5)

Production and design 
Dennis Köhne – mixing, mastering
Hjördis – photography
Bernhard Weiß – cover art
Nina Stöcker – artwork

References 

Dawn of Destiny albums
2015 albums